Thomas J. Vigorito  (born October 23, 1959) is a former American football wide receiver and running back in the National Football League (NFL). He was drafted by the Miami Dolphins in the fifth round of the 1981 NFL Draft. He played college football at Virginia.

References

1959 births
Living people
American football wide receivers
American football running backs
American football return specialists
Virginia Cavaliers football players
Miami Dolphins players